The 1st Support Group was a formation of the Australian Army during World War II. The brigade was formed in February 1942, at Victoria Barracks, Sydney and assigned to the 1st Armoured Division. Support Groups were brigade sized formations assigned to armoured divisions that commanded the infantry and artillery elements. The Support Group did not see any active service and was disbanded at Narrabri, New South Wales in November 1942.

Brigade units
All units that served with the brigade during the war.
17th Motor Regiment
108th Anti Tank Regiment, Royal Australian Artillery
16th Field Regiment,  Royal Australian Artillery

See also
List of Australian Army brigades

References

Brigades of Australia